Draâ El Mizan District is a district of Tizi Ouzou Province, Algeria.

Localities
Boufhaima

Districts of Tizi Ouzou Province